Soccer Iraq is an English-based Iraqi website and social media agency providing a variety of news, statistics and services for Iraqi football, ranging from coverage on the Iraq national football team and its players to news on the Iraqi Premier League.

History

Soccer Iraq launched on 11 March 2015 with the aim of creating an English-based website covering Iraq's national football team, the Lions of Mesopotamia, as well as the domestic club competitions and the nation's foreign-based players. In 2017, Soccer Iraq assisted the Iraq Football Association (IFA) in the process of verifying the IFA's official social media profiles. In 2020, Soccer Iraq helped facilitate Safaa Hadi's move to the Russian Premier League by streamlining the communication of the Russian Football Union and PFC Krylia Sovetov with Al-Shorta SC regarding the completion of administrative procedures. Soccer Iraq has also been involved in research into the earliest league and cup tournaments played in Iraq. Several current and former international players are in regular interaction with the website's posts on social media.

Providing Information

Throughout the years, Soccer Iraq has provided information regarding the Iraqi game to many major news networks and has been relied on by news organisations around the world, such as International Business Times, La Gazzetta dello Sport, Marca, L'Equipe, Goal, Al Jazeera, ESPN FC, Asian Football Confederation, Diario AS, Daily Mail, Daily Express, Sport.ro, Major League Soccer, Panorama, Mundo Deportivo, The Washington Post, The National, Fox Sports, Transfermarkt, RT, Emarat Al Youm, 90min.com, SPORTbible, Vancouver Whitecaps FC, Tuttosport, Sportskeeda, Football Manager, Telemundo Deportes, Het Nieuwsblad, Corriere dello Sport, Le Matin, Index.hr, Bola, Sport1, L'essentiel, Vanity Fair, NOS, Algemeen Dagblad, Thanh Niên, Siol, La Nación, NRC Handelsblad, Cumhuriyet, Al Akhbar, Radiotelevizija Slovenija, Kurir, El Comercio, La República, El Liberal, La Prensa, Koran Sindo, Žurnal24, DV, The New Arab, TyC Sports, Nova Sport 1, HobbyConsolas and Kurdistan 24.

Notable Interviewees

The website has published several interviews since its launch – most recently with Gonzalo Rodríguez García, Osama Rashid, Mohannad Abdul-Raheem, Rebin Sulaka, Lorival Santos, Marin Ion, Justin Meram and Ali Adnan.

Player of the Year 
Soccer Iraq launched an Iraqi Player of the Year award for the first time in 2021. Mohammed Qasim Majid won the inaugural award and was congratulated by his club Al-Shorta SC.

Goal of the Season 
Soccer Iraq launched the first ever Goal of the Season competition for the Iraqi Premier League starting from the 2016–17 season. The winner is chosen by a Twitter poll between the four best goals. Al-Zawraa midfielder Ali Raheem won the award in both of its first two seasons.

Source

Team of the Decade 
In late 2019, Soccer Iraq commemorated the end of the 2010s with the Soccer Iraq Team of the Decade which was voted for by fans over a two-month period via a series of Twitter polls. After several thousands of votes, 28 players were narrowed down to the final eleven and the team was revealed on 31 December 2019. The selection of Mohanad Ali in the Team of the Decade was discussed by the official Asian Football Confederation broadcast during Iraq's match with Iran in 2022 FIFA World Cup qualifiers.
2010–2019

References 

Association football websites
Iraqi sport websites